Alan Shawn Feinstein (born 1931) is an American Philanthropist and former mail-order and Internet promoter.

Biography

Early years
Feinstein was born in Milton, Massachusetts in 1931. He grew up in Dorchester, Massachusetts.

He graduated from Boston University where he studied economics and journalism. After graduating, he wrote advertisements for a shoe company, but was unsatisfied with the experience. He attended Boston Teachers' College at night and taught elementary and junior high school in Massachusetts and Rhode Island.

He married Dr. Pratarnporn Chiemwichit, a child psychiatrist, in 1963 and moved to Rhode Island.  As part of an extended trip to Thailand in 1965, Feinstein had a private audience with King Bhumibol Adulyadej. The couple returned in 1966 and settled in Cranston, Rhode Island, where they still live today.

He and his wife have three children: Leila Feinstein, a television news anchor KTLA; Ari, a salesman and entrepreneur, who died in 2021; and Richard, a writer, who died in 2008.

Business
His booklet Making Your Money Grow was advertised in various publications and sold several hundred thousand copies. He built his newsletter and collectibles business buying mailing lists from brokers. He established two newsletters, International Insider's Report and The Wealth Maker which attracted circulation of 400,000. Feinstein offered collectibles, including coins and president autographs, as well as such items as a gold leaf-lined set of cards honoring Babe Ruth's 100th birthday issued by Guyana in collaboration with Feinstein.

Feinstein also started a newspaper column which was widely syndicated.  He wrote several self-published booklets: "How to Make Money," "How to Make Money Fast," etc.  He also wrote a novel and several children's books which were published by A.S. Barnes/Yoseloff Publishing Company. In 1984, Prentice Hall published The Four Treasures of Alan Shawn Feinstein, a book written by a New York author, Milton Pierce.

Much of Feinstein's wealth came from selling philatelic 'collectibles' through newsletters independent of the stamp collector community under a business model in which purchasers had a one-year money-back guarantee, including a "Face on Mars" stamp set issued by Sierra Leone promoted with a claim that the value of the stamps would soar once alien life was discovered on Mars, a claim which has garnered him criticism.  Feinstein's stamps have been valued at prices lower than his newsletters predicted.

Philanthropy and Controversy
Feinstein founded the Feinstein Foundation in 1991. By 2008 over 125,000 children have been in his school program and are recognized as Feinstein Junior Scholars for promising to do good deeds for others.

He was heavily involved in founding the first public high school with community service as its central focus, the Feinstein High School in Providence, named in his honor.

Feinstein requires that institutions that he aids be renamed in either his honor or in the names of his family members, a practice that has sometimes resulted in controversy due to the source of his funds and also because of his purchases of time on local television stations advertising his donations.

The focus of Feinstein's community service efforts has been in helping raise funds to fight hunger, which has included the annual "Feinstein Challenge", initiated in 1996, which encourages local organizations to raise funds with a portion of the amounts raised by the organizations matched by the foundation with $1 million distributed annually. The Feinstein Challenges have raised over $1 billion for them to date.

The Feinstein Foundation and Feinstein Family Fund had about $43 million in assets in 2005.

Currently, Feinstein offers a payback program to Rhode Island students who join in supporting his campaign to fight hunger.

Alan Shawn Feinstein’s 2012 15th annual spring $1 million giveaway to fight hunger raised $230,664,188 nationwide.
 
1863 anti-hunger agencies and houses of worship throughout the country participated. The Feinstein $1 million is being divided proportionally among them.
 
Feinstein started his yearly $1 million spring giveaway in 1997.  Since its inception, his annual campaign every March and April has raised over $2.5 billion.

Brandeis lawsuit

In the early 1990s, Feinstein collaborated with Brown University to found the Feinstein World Hunger Program, a university research and teaching center dedicated to studying the causes of and possible solutions to hunger, which later moved to Tufts University. In 2000, he entered into an agreement with a Tufts professor, J. Larry Brown, to give $3 million to start another similar center at Brandeis University. A dispute between them developed and Feinstein sued Brown. In his lawsuit, Feinstein also accused Brown of defamation, a claim that was later dismissed.

Westerly controversy 

Initially offering $1 million to Westerly Middle School in Westerly, RI, Feinstein withdrew because of a controversy in the community over his requirement that the school be renamed for him.  Feinstein said, "If it’s going to cause any friction whatsoever, I would rather withdraw the offer."

Baseball contracts

In 1993, Feinstein spent $99,000 to purchase the contract by which the Boston Red Sox traded Babe Ruth to the New York Yankees, thus initiating the "Curse of the Bambino". In 2004, when the Red Sox won their first world series in over 80 years, Feinstein auctioned off this contract at Sotheby's for $996,000, giving the proceeds to anti-hunger agencies around the country.

He recently purchased the contract that sent Ted Williams to the Red Sox in 1937. He plans to give the proceeds, when he resells it, to agencies fighting hunger.

Feinstein is the honorary chairman of the World Scholar Athlete Games. He gave $1 million to construct their Hall of Fame building.

Awards

He has received many awards for his philanthropy, including the Distinguished Services Award from the American History Society; the Longfellow Humanitarian Award from the American Red Cross; and was named Rhode Island Citizen of the Year by the March of Dimes. He was awarded the President's Medal at both Rhode Island College and Brown. He has been named to the Rhode Island Hall of Fame. He has been awarded honorary doctorates by Providence College, Salve Regina University, Johnson & Wales University, Roger Williams University, Rhode Island College, the University of Rhode Island and the New England Institute of Technology.

Several schools are named in his honor. The most recent, Alan Shawn Feinstein Middle School of Coventry (Formerly Knotty Oak) is named after him, after he donated 1 million dollars to the school, making community service a requisite there.

IMAX lawsuit

Feinstein had signed an agreement with IMAX in 2003 to name the firm's IMAX theater at the Providence Place Mall for his foundation. In exchange for a total of $1.4 million paid over five years, the theater would offer 50,000 free tickets to students participating in Feinstein's community service programs, offer discounted admission to students who have performed good deeds and donate a portion of these ticket sales to the Rhode Island Hunger Fund. The agreement was extended in 2005 with the stipulation that the naming rights would become permanent if all conditions were met. After the theater was purchased by National Amusements in January 2008, The Feinstein name was removed and the community programs were suspended. Feinstein filed a lawsuit against IMAX and National Amusements, but National Amusements asserts that its deal to purchase the theater included the furniture and equipment, but no other obligations. Imax settled with Feinstein out of court for an undisclosed amount.

Books by Alan Feinstein
Triumph! (1960)
Folk Tales from Siam (1969)
Folk Tales from Persia (1971)
Folk Tales from Portugal (1972)
How to Make Money Fast (1975)

References

External links
Feinstein Foundation

1931 births
Living people
American philanthropists
Boston University alumni
People from Milton, Massachusetts
People from Dorchester, Massachusetts